Serhiy Valeriyovych Pylypchuk (born 26 November 1984 in Zmiiv) is a Ukrainian footballer who plays for FC Vovchansk.

Honours 
Ukraine under-21
UEFA U-21 Championship 2006: runner-up

References

External links

Ukrainian footballers
Ukrainian expatriate footballers
Living people
1984 births
FC Metalist Kharkiv players
FC Metalurh Donetsk players
Ukrainian Premier League players
Ukrainian First League players
Ukrainian Second League players
Ukrainian Amateur Football Championship players
FC Khimki players
PFC Spartak Nalchik players
Russian Premier League players
People from Zmiiv
FC Shinnik Yaroslavl players
FC Volga Nizhny Novgorod players
Ukraine under-21 international footballers
FC Volyn Lutsk players
Ekstraklasa players
Korona Kielce players
Wigry Suwałki players
Chojniczanka Chojnice players
FC Vovchansk players
Expatriate footballers in Russia
Expatriate footballers in Poland
Ukrainian expatriate sportspeople in Russia
Ukrainian expatriate sportspeople in Poland
Association football midfielders
Sportspeople from Kharkiv Oblast